The Operations (J3) directorate is the Continental Staff System branch of the U.S. DOD Joint Staff responsible for military operations. 

It is the third level of the US National Level Command Structure, primarily assists the Chairman of the Joint Chiefs of Staff (CJCS) in carrying out responsibilities as the principal  military advisor to the President and Secretary of Defense. Operations develops and provides guidance to the Combatant Commanders; relays communications between the President, Secretary of Defense, Combatant Commanders regarding current operations and plans.

It is headed by the Director, Operations, staff code J3, a two-star major general or rear admiral.

The National Military Command Center (NMCC) is part of the J3 directorate.

References

Joint Chiefs of Staff